Cross of Gradac  is a cultural monument located in the village of  Gradac on the property of Ćurčić Dragutin, surrounded by a field. The cross was built in 1645 and served as a village record.

Architecture
Despite its unusually large size, the Cross of Gradac is not near a cemetery, nor is it thought to have been designed to be part of a graveyard. Its purpose is undetermined. The Cross is shallowly inscribed with Cyrillic text, but has been badly damaged, making it consequently difficult to read. This cross was used as a village record for more than a century. A partial decryption shows that the symbols are from the early Christian period and were inscribed in 1662.

References

External links
Republic Institute for Protection of Cultural Monuments - Belgrade

Gradac
Ivanjica